Thomas Alfred Edgar "Sonny" Douglas (8 February 1884 – 20 December 1964) was an Australian rules footballer who played with Fitzroy in the Victorian Football League (VFL).

Notes

External links 

1884 births
1964 deaths
Australian rules footballers from Melbourne
Fitzroy Football Club players